Sphallerocarpus is a monotypic genus of flowering plants belonging to the family Apiaceae. Its only species is Sphallerocarpus gracilis. Its native range is Siberia to Korea.

References

Apioideae
Monotypic Apioideae genera